Albert Fontenot (born September 17, 1970) is a former professional American football player for the Chicago Bears of the National Football League. The defensive lineman was a fourth-round draft pick in 1993 NFL Draft by the Bears out of Baylor.

References

1970 births
Living people
American football defensive ends
American football defensive tackles
Navarro Bulldogs football players
Players of American football from Houston
Baylor Bears football players
Chicago Bears players
Indianapolis Colts players
San Diego Chargers players